The International Gas Union (IGU) is a global association promoting the gas industry. It was founded in 1931, registered in Vevey, Switzerland with the Secretariat currently located in Barcelona, Spain.  

The IGU promotes gas as an energy source. IGU has over 150 members, which are gas industry corporations and associations. The working organisation of IGU covers the gas chain from exploration and production, transmission via pipelines and liquefied natural gas (LNG), as well as distribution and combustion of gas at the point of use.

The IGU organises the global gas events World Gas Conference (WGC), LNG X and IGRC X, every three years. The WGC is held in the country holding the Presidency of the IGU. Due to the coronavirus pandemic, the forthcoming WGC 2021 was re-branded as WGC 22 and rescheduled to May 23–27, 2022 in Daegu, Korea.  LNG 2022 was re-branded to LNG 2023 and rescheduled to July 3–7, 2023 in St. Petersburg, Russia.   IGRC 2020 took place in February 2020 in Muscat, Oman. 

The IGU annually issues reports, including the Global Gas Report, World LNG Report and the Wholesale Price Survey Report. In June 2020, the IGU launched the publication, Global Voice of Gas.

On November 9, 2020, the IGU announced the appointment of Mr Andy Calitz as its next secretary-general with effect from 1 August 2021. Calitz was a member of Shell's senior executive group for almost 15 years and was to start serving as deputy secretary general for a four-month transition period from 1 April 2021. Current secretary-general Luis Bertran was to complete his mandate in July 2021.

On November 23, 2020, the IGU announced that Italy has been chosen to hold the organisation's presidency from 2025 to 2028. The city of Milan will also host the 30th World Gas Conference in 2028.  Prior to assuming the role of president, the head of Italy's presidential team, Mr Andrea Stegher will serve the IGU as vice president, initially alongside Madam Li Yalan of the People's Republic of China, who will become president after the next World Gas Conference in Daegu, South Korea.

The present leadership of the IGU is as follows: Dr. Joe Kang acts as president of the IGU for 2018–2021 on behalf of the Korean presidency.  Luis Bertran is secretary general of IGU.  Mdm Li Yalan is the vice-president and David Carroll is the past president of the IGU on behalf of the USA presidency (2015–2018).

References

External links 

 IGU official website
 IGU Global Voice of Gas
 IGU Global Gas Report 2019
 IGU World LNG Report 2020
 IGU Wholesale Price Survey Index 2020
 IGU World Gas Conference 2021, Daegu, Korea 

Natural gas organizations
International energy organizations
Non-profit organisations based in Spain
Organizations established in 1931
Organisations based in Barcelona